Stephanorrhina julia is a species of beetles of the family Scarabaeidae, subfamily Cetoniinae and tribe Goliathini.

Description
It has a brilliant metallic green and red coloration, with whitish spots on the elytra.

Distribution
This species occurs in Cameroon.

References
 Biolib

External links
 Flower-beetles
 Kaefer-der-welt

Cetoniinae
Beetles of Africa
Endemic fauna of Cameroon
Insects of Cameroon
Beetles described in 1879